Brian Gordon may refer to:
 Brian Gordon (baseball)
 Brian Gordon (cartoonist)